Love Is Always Seventeen is the final solo album by the American musician David Gates. It came after a 13-year break from recording. The album was released in 1994.

Critical reception
The Los Angeles Times wrote: "Hummable melodies still come to Gates as easily as in the '70s; his lyrics remain simplistically romantic, as the title suggests." The Vancouver Sun deemed the album "breezy, cheerful country music." The Calgary Herald determined that "there is the occasional song where you want to sock him in the jaw and tell him to toughen up but, overall, he's come up with an album that's from the heart, for the heart and full of heart."

Track listing 
"Avenue of Love"
"Love Is Always Seventeen"
"Ordinary Man"
"I Will Wait for You"
"Save This Dance for Me"
"No Secrets in a Small Town"
"Heart, It's All Over"
"I Don't Want to Share Your Love"
"I Can't Find the Words to Say Goodbye"
"Dear World"
"Thankin' You Sweet Baby James"

Personnel
David Gates - vocals, acoustic guitar, arrangements
Brent Mason - electric guitar
Paul Franklin - steel guitar
Lee Roy Parnell - slide guitar
Glenn Worf, Michael Rhodes - bass
Jerry Douglas - Dobro
Rob Hajacos - fiddle
Matt Rollings, Steve Nathan - keyboards
Larry Knechtel - piano
Eddie Bayers, Paul Leim - drums
Terry McMillan - harmonica
Mike Haynes - flugelhorn
Billy Dean, Victoria Shaw, W.O. Smith Music School Singers - backing vocals

References 

1994 albums
David Gates albums